Bethel Nnaemeka Amadi   (25 April 1964 – 10 February 2019) was a Nigerian politician. He served as President of the Pan-African Parliament between 2012 and 2015.

Career
Amadi was born on 25 April 1964 to parents from Imo State. He went to the University of Jos where he obtained a bachelor's degree in Law with Honors. He was called to the bar in 1986. In the early 1990s Amadi worked in the oil business in Nigeria and together with others he founded a law firm.

Between 2012 and 2015 he served as President of the Pan-African Parliament. On 27 May 2015 his successor Roger Nkodo Dang was elected. Amadi died on 10 February 2019.

References

1964 births
2019 deaths
Members of the Pan-African Parliament from Nigeria
University of Jos alumni
Igbo people
Presidents of Pan-African Parliament